Riverdale Park–Kenilworth is a light rail station that is currently under construction. It will be part of the Purple Line in Maryland. The station will be located southeast of the intersection of East West Highway and Kenilworth Avenue.

History 
The Purple Line system is under construction as of 2022 and is scheduled to open in 2026.

Station layout
The station consists of two side platforms just south of East West Highway and west of Riverdale Road.

References

Purple Line (Maryland)
Railway stations scheduled to open in 2026
Transportation in Prince George's County, Maryland
Railway stations in Prince George's County, Maryland
Riverdale Park, Maryland